Shopski Cove is a 2.6 km wide cove indenting for 1.9 km the southwest coast of Greenwich Island in the South Shetland Islands, Antarctica, between Triangle Point and the westernmost extremity of the moraine spit of Provadiya Hook protecting Yankee Harbour.  Shape enhanced as a result of Bravo Glacier’s retreat in the late 20th and early 21st century.  The area was visited by early 19th century sealers operating from Yankee Harbour.

The feature is named "after the Shoppe Region in Western Bulgaria."

Location
Bulgarian mapping in 2005 and 2009.

Maps
 South Shetland Islands. Scale 1:200000 topographic map. DOS 610 Sheet W 62 58. Tolworth, UK, 1968.
 L.L. Ivanov et al. Antarctica: Livingston Island and Greenwich Island, South Shetland Islands. Scale 1:100000 topographic map. Sofia: Antarctic Place-names Commission of Bulgaria, 2005.
 L.L. Ivanov. Antarctica: Livingston Island and Greenwich, Robert, Snow and Smith Islands. Scale 1:120000 topographic map.  Troyan: Manfred Wörner Foundation, 2009.  
 Antarctic Digital Database (ADD). Scale 1:250000 topographic map of Antarctica. Scientific Committee on Antarctic Research (SCAR). Since 1993, regularly updated.
 L.L. Ivanov. Antarctica: Livingston Island and Smith Island. Scale 1:100000 topographic map. Manfred Wörner Foundation, 2017.

Notes

References
 Bulgarian Antarctic Gazetteer. Antarctic Place-names Commission. (details in Bulgarian, basic data in English)

External links
 Shopski Cove. Copernix satellite image

Coves of Greenwich Island